Launching Place was a railway station on the Warburton line in Melbourne, Australia. Serving the local village of Launching Place, the station operated until the line closed in 1965.  All that remains of this station are the concrete pillars of the station platform retaining wall.

External links
Launching Place station shortly after closing, 24 November 1964.
Walker diesel rail car at Launching Place station, 1964.

Disused railway stations in Melbourne
Railway stations in Australia opened in 1901
Railway stations closed in 1965